Sidney Carroll (May 25, 1913 – November 3, 1988) was an American film and television screenwriter.  Although Carroll wrote most frequently for television, he is perhaps best remembered today for writing the screenplays for The Hustler (1961) for which he was nominated for an Academy Award and for A Big Hand for the Little Lady (1966).   He has also won Emmys for the documentaries The Louvre (1978) and China and the Forbidden City (1963).  In 1957, Carroll won an Edgar Award, in the category Best Episode in a TV Series, for writing  "The Fine Art of Murder", an installment of the ABC program Omnibus.  He wrote the screenplays for the 1974 Richard Chamberlain television version of The Count of Monte Cristo as well as the original story for the Michael Caine heist movie Gambit. He continued to write for television until 1986.

Carroll is also remembered for a story called None Before Me which Ray Bradbury included in the anthology Timeless Stories for Today and Tomorrow.  It describes a lonely miser who becomes fascinated by a lavish dollhouse.  Bradbury's book is an anthology of fantasy stories, and it is only in the last sentence that the story turns to fantasy, with rather startling results.
 
Carroll was married to Broadway lyricist June Carroll from 1940 until his death. He is the father of prize-winning novelist Jonathan Carroll.  He graduated from Harvard University in 1934.

References

External links

1913 births
1988 deaths
American male screenwriters
Jewish American screenwriters
Edgar Award winners
Harvard University alumni
20th-century American male writers
20th-century American screenwriters
20th-century American Jews